Sam Kito III (born 1964) is an American politician from Alaska. A Democrat, he served in the Alaska House of Representatives as one of two representatives from Juneau since his appointment in 2014 until 2019.

A lobbyist and civil engineer by trade, Kito was appointed to serve out the term of Beth Kerttula in House District 32 after she resigned in early 2014. Governor Sean Parnell selected him in February from among three nominees forwarded by the Tongass Democrats, passing over Juneau Assemblyman Jesse Kiehl and Juneau School District budget committeewoman Catherine Reardon. He was sworn in on February 26, 2014, and joined the Democratic-led minority caucus.

After his appointment, Kito ran for election to a full term in House District 33 (due to redistricting) and won in a landslide over Republican Peter Dukowitz.

When the legislature eliminated per diem payments for any legislator who lived within 50 miles of the state capital of Juneau, he concluded he could not keep his daughter in college on his small legislative salary, so did not run for reelection. His compensation would have been cut from $82,488 to $50,400.

Personal life
Kito was born in Anchorage and lives in Juneau. He is of Tlingit and Japanese heritage. He has a teenage daughter. His father, Sam Kito, Jr., is a long time lobbyist. He is named for his grandfather, Sam Kito, Sr., a resident of Petersburg who was interned in a U.S. government camp in Idaho during World War II.

References

External links
 Sam Kito at 100 Years of Alaska's Legislature

1964 births
21st-century American politicians
21st-century Native Americans
Alaska Native people
American civil engineers
American lobbyists
American politicians of Japanese descent
Asian-American people in Alaska politics
Date of birth missing (living people)
Engineers from Alaska
Living people
Democratic Party members of the Alaska House of Representatives
Native American state legislators in Alaska
Politicians from Anchorage, Alaska
Politicians from Fairbanks, Alaska
Politicians from Juneau, Alaska
Tlingit people